Diplacus pygmaeus is a species of monkeyflower (Family Phrymaceae) known by the common name Egg Lake monkeyflower.

Distribution and habitat
It is native to northeastern California and adjacent sections of Oregon, where it grows in sagebrush and wet, open habitat in scrub, forest, and woodland. Once thought to be extremely rare and vulnerable, the plant is actually locally common in areas where the soil has been recently disturbed, allowing a probably large seed bank to germinate.

Despite its annual population sometimes running into the millions, the plant is threatened when large-scale disturbances occur.

Description
This is a petite annual herb forming dense tufts often just a few millimeters high. The lightly hairy oval or widely lance-shaped leaves are up to 1.5 centimeters long. The yellow flower is no more than a centimeter long, its tubular base encapsulated in a hairy calyx of sepals.

References

External links
Jepson Manual Treatment
USDA Plants Profile
Photo gallery

pygmaeus
Flora of California
Flora of Oregon
Flora of the Cascade Range
Flora of the Great Basin
Flora of the Sierra Nevada (United States)
Flora without expected TNC conservation status